Enamul Karim Nirjhar (born 29 November 1962) is a Bangladeshi architect and filmmaker.

Nirjhar is the founder and principal architect of System Architects. As one of the most prominent architectural studio practicing contemporary architecture of various residential, mixed use, commercial, institutional, industrial, hospitality, community development, and other projects. His eye opening interior design initiative, which targeted restaurants during the 1990s, had a strong influence on numerous restaurants in Dhaka city. By that time, he designed different conceptual restaurants in Dhaka, Chittagong, and UK like Bukhara, Santoor, Bonanza, White Castle, Asparagus, WE etc. His another idea for horror themed family entertainment restaurant Voot made a huge craze. Later he made his team much more wider for standard architecture practice. Which they called Total Architecture. Some of the notable projects includes British American Tobacco Dhaka headquarters, nina Kabbo, Fera

Very recently Nirjhar initiated a new collaboration with Indian entrepreneurs and architects and started System Architects India. Furthermore, Nirjhar is one of the most prominent filmmakers of Bangladesh. His filmography includes two full-length feature films Aha! (2007), Nomuna (2009)

Nirjhar's journey as an architect along with film making and song making is culminating towards creating a collaborative platform, EK Nijhar Collaborations which will be aimed towards the creative and intellectual empowerment of a young creative. The first step towards that, EK Nirjaharer Gaan, the collaborative music initiative with artists from West Bengal and Bangladesh is currently going on from the music platform Gaanshala. It hopes to become the biggest music community in south-east Asia.

Early life and education
Nirjhar was born to Muhammad Afsar Ali and Momtaz Begum in Rajshahi. In the mid-1970s, he was admitted to Rajshahi Cadet College. He studied architecture From Bangladesh University of Engineering and Technology (BUET).

Career

Architecture
In 1995 Ek Nirjhar formed System Architects. From the very beginning he was involved in the process of designing every little detail of all the projects. From mid 90s to 2005 he designed a number of popular restaurants.  In 2000 he designed the first ever theatre restaurant in Bangladesh called Asparagus where fine dining combined with live performances was quite a new experience for the food lovers of the city. In 2005 he designed the first horror themed restaurant named Voot ('Ghost' in English) in Dhaka with his regular collaborators. Other restaurants he designed includes White Castle, Bukhara, Santoor, Hotel Agrabad, We in Dhaka, Chittagong and UK where he tried to put his social observations in the form of profiling and performance. Integration of our culture and heritage, empowerment of the craftsmen along with combining other art forms with the design was a key aspect in his design to give a combined thematic restaurant experience.

After this period, Nirjhar designed quite a few residential buildings. He also started a trend of naming and engraving meaningful Bangla words like names of the lost rivers of Bengal, beautiful phrases on the facades of buildings. Some wonderful examples of this can be found in his residential designs like Jethay, Hochhe Hobe and Fera.

In 2003, Nirjhar designed the Head Office Complex of British American Tobacco Dhaka. For which he was awarded with the AYA JK cement Architect of the Year award in 2005. In 2013 he designed conceptual commercial neighborhood titled 'nina Kabbo' where the poems of 12 prominent poets of Bangla literature was used on different faced of the building for the first time in Bangladesh. He was awarded a Berger Award of Excellence in Architecture for the design of the building.

Film

Nirjhar started his film career directing short documentary films on social issues including The Shadow Gap (2003), Tini (The Architect) (2005), and Manush, Koyta, Asche (2006). He released two feature films - Aha! (2007) and Nomuna (2009). The film Aha! won Bangladesh National Film Awards in four categories. It was Bangladesh's submission for the Academy Award for Best Foreign Language Film in 2007, but was not nominated.

Nirjhar's second film, Nomuna (2009), was a dystopian social satire about political turmoil. Apart from directing, he also wrote the story, script, and songs for the film. The eight-song soundtrack was released in September 2009, but the Bangladesh Film Censor Board refused to issue the film a censor certificate.

As the founder of 9 STEPS currently he is trying to develop a self-dependent group of creative, technical, commercial professionals who will contribute to future film and media industry with a collective vision. In the process he is proceeding with multiple film projects with a young generation of film enthusiasts.

Photography and writing

From an early period, Nirjhar was very much involved in photography as another of his passions. He participated in several exhibitions with his photography works. Bornodhara (2001), a book of his photography and poetry, was a tribute to the Bangla alphabet and language.

Nirjhar joined the popular humor magazine Unmad and in the mid-1980s became a contributor to the weekly Sachitra Shandhani. He was the initiator of an experimental magazine on cinema named Kino Eye and literary magazine Potito Shubash. He has also written three books of stories: Kanush (2010), Jaa (2012), and Oboshesh Ongshobishesh.

Album Ek Nirjharer Gaan is a compilation of 101 Bangla songs written and composed by Nirjhar and released on label Gaanshala.

Song making 

Nirjhar is working on a musical project called EK Nirjaharer Gaan. It is the first project in series of projects from EK Nijhar Collaborations that hopes to create a platform for creative and intellectual empowerment for the dedicated people working in the creative industries.

With Nirjhar's lyric and tune the first compilation of 101 songs have been published in all major digital platforms. Currently the later versions of the project are going on. All updates of this project can be found on Gaanshala. The first of its kind music platform hopes to become the biggest community of musicians in south-east Asia.

Filmography
 Tarona (2001)
 The Shadow Gap (2003)
 Kheyal (2003)
 Kohen (2004)
 Tokhon (2004)
 Ebong Porobashi (2004)
 Tini (The Architect) (2005)
 Manush, Koyta, Ashchhe (2006)
 Aha! (2007)

Awards
Architecture
 AYA (2007)
 Excellence in Architecture (2013)
Film
 Bangladesh National Film Awards in 4 categories (2007)
Photography
 National Winner of Kodak Fiap Photography Competition (1992)

References

External links
 

Living people
1962 births
Bangladeshi architects
Bangladeshi film directors
Best Director National Film Award (Bangladesh) winners
Bangladesh University of Engineering and Technology alumni